James Theirs Harrison Lovie (born 19 September 1932) is a Scottish former footballer, who played as a left winger. Lovie began his career in the early 1950s with Dundee United before moving back to hometown club Peterhead, where he had begun his youth career. In 1957, Lovie headed south to join Bury, moving on to Bournemouth and Chesterfield before finishing his career in the lower leagues.

References

External links
 

1932 births
People from Peterhead
Living people
Scottish footballers
Scottish Football League players
English Football League players
Dundee United F.C. players
Peterhead F.C. players
Bury F.C. players
AFC Bournemouth players
Chesterfield F.C. players
Association football midfielders
Footballers from Aberdeenshire